Surface water is water located on top of land, forming terrestrial (surrounding by land on all sides) waterbodies, and may also be referred to as blue water, opposed to the seawater and waterbodies like the ocean.

The vast majority of surface water is produced by precipitation. As the climate warms in the spring, snowmelt runs off towards nearby streams and rivers contributing towards a large portion of human drinking water. Levels of surface water lessen as a result of evaporation as well as water moving into the ground becoming ground-water. Alongside being used for drinking water, surface water is also used for irrigation, wastewater treatment, livestock, industrial uses, hydropower, and recreation. For USGS water-use reports, surface water is considered freshwater when it contains less than 1,000 milligrams per liter (mg/L) of dissolved solids.

There are three major types of surface water. Permanent (perennial) surface waters are present year round, and includes lakes, rivers and wetlands (marshes and swamps). Semi-permanent (ephemeral) surface water refers to bodies of water that are only present at certain times of the year including seasonally dry channels such as creeks, lagoons and waterholes. Man-made surface water is water that can be continued by infrastructures that humans have assembled. This would be dammed artificial lakes, canals and artificial ponds (e.g. garden ponds) or swamps. The surface water held by dams can be used for renewable energy in the form of hydropower. Hydropower is the forcing of surface water sourced from rivers and streams to produce energy.

Measurement 

Surface water can be measured as annual runoff. This includes the amount of rain and snowmelt drainage left after the uptake of nature, evaporation from land, and transpiration from vegetation. In areas such as California, the California Water Science Center records the flow of surface water and annual runoff by utilizing a network of approximately 500 stream gages collecting real time data from all across the state. This then contributes to the 8,000 stream gage stations that are overseen by the USGS national stream gage record. This in turn has provided to date records and documents of water data over the years. Management teams that oversee the distribution of water are then able to make decisions of adequate water supply to sectors. These include municipal, industrial, agricultural, renewable energy (hydropower), and storage in reservoirs.

Impacts of climate change 

Due to climate change, sea ice and glaciers are melting, contributing to the rise in sea levels. As a result, salt water from the ocean is beginning to infiltrate our freshwater aquifers contaminating water used for urban and agricultural services. It is also affecting surrounding ecosystems as it places stress on the wildlife inhabiting those areas. It was recorded by the NOAA in the years 2012 to 2016, ice sheets in Greenland and the Antarctic reduced by 247 billion tons per year. This number will continue to increase as global warming persists.

Climate change has a direct connection with the water cycle. It has increased evaporation yet decreased precipitation, runoff, groundwater, and soil moisture. This has altered surface water levels. Climate change also enhances the existing challenges we face in water quality. The quality of surface water is based on the chemical inputs from the surrounding elements such as the air and the nearby landscape. When these elements are polluted due to human activity, it alters the chemistry of the water.

Conjunctive use of ground and surface water
Surface and groundwater are two separate entities, so they must be regarded as such. However, there is an ever-increasing need for management of the two as they are part of an interrelated system that is paramount when the demand for water exceeds the available supply (Fetter 464). Depletion of surface and ground water sources for public consumption (including industrial, commercial, and residential) is caused by over-pumping. Aquifers near river systems that are over-pumped have been known to deplete surface water sources as well. Research supporting this has been found in numerous water budgets for a multitude of cities.

Response times for an aquifer are long (Young & Bredehoeft 1972). However, a total ban on ground water usage during water recessions would allow surface water to retain better levels required for sustainable aquatic life. By reducing ground water pumping, the surface water supplies will be able to maintain their levels, as they recharge from direct precipitation, surface runoff, etc.

It is recorded by the Environmental Protection Agency (EPA), that approximately 68 percent of water provided to communities in the United States comes from surface water.

See also

Environmental persistent pharmaceutical pollutant
Meltwater
Optimum water content for tillage
Water resources
Surface-water hydrology

References 

 Applied Hydrogeology, Fourth Edition by C.W. Fetter.
 R.A. Young and J.D. Bredehoeft Digital simulation for solving management problems with conjunctive groundwater and surface water systems from Water Resources Research 8:533-56

External links 
 "Surface Water," Iowa State University

Hydrology
Water